Parthus or Parthos (Ancient Greek: Πάρθος; Latin: Parthus) was a settlement of the Illyrian tribe of the Parthini in southern Illyria, modern Albania. Although different sites in central Albania have been proposed, its exact location has not yet been found.

See also 
 List of settlements in Illyria

References

Bibliography 

Cities in ancient Illyria
Illyrian Albania
Former populated places in the Balkans